South Sudan and Uganda are neighboring states with strong cultural economic and political ties. The South Sudan and the neighbouring state of Uganda enjoy relatively strong cultural, political, and economic ties. As South Sudan neared independence, both states begun to take advantage of increased opportunities for trade, development and educational exchanges.  The rebel group Lord's Resistance Army (LRA), however, continues to operate in the border areas between South Sudan, the Democratic Republic of Congo and Uganda.

Political ties
Political relationship between South Sudan and Uganda have been friendly for several decades, in contrast to Kampala's relationships with the Khartoum government, which have often been strained.  One reason for this is that Sudan's President, Omar al-Bashir, is alleged to have provided support to the LRA, which terrorized northern Uganda for many years.

Uganda's longtime President, Yoweri Museveni, was a personal friend of South Sudan rebel leader John Garang and supported the Sudan People's Liberation Army (SPLA), which fought for the region's independence.  A day before South Sudan voted on a cessation referendum, Museveni came out vocally for separation, saying, "…unity should be principled unity; not unity based on suppression and inequality."

Two weeks after the ouster of Sudan's Omar al-Bashir, Uganda's foreign minister Okello Oryem, has announced that his country may offer Bashir refuge.

Economic ties 
South Sudan has emerged in recent years as the largest importer of Ugandan goods. Over 150,000 Ugandan traders operate across the border, generating an estimated $900 million in business. South Sudan relies heavily on its neighbors to provide goods such as construction materials and services such as skilled and unskilled labor. Approximately 1,500 Ugandans work in Southern Sudan in the construction industry, and 1,200 Ugandan professional are employed there with non-governmental organizations, ministries and industries.

The governments of Uganda and Southern Sudan have taken steps to strengthen economies ties, including a joint project to construct a state-of-the-art market in Juba, estimated to cost around $850,000.

Challenges to Ugandan trade and business in Southern Sudan include concerns over corruption and discrimination, poor road conditions, and language barriers.  Construction is underway on a railroad line that will link Juba and parts of northern Uganda.

Educational exchange 
Over 100,000 students from Southern Sudan are currently attending school in Uganda and thousands more are expected to pursue undergraduate and graduate education in Kenya and Uganda in coming years. At the same time, many teachers from Kenya and Uganda have come to Southern Sudan to teach, given the region's shortage of professionally trained educators.

Border disputes 

A border dispute emerged in 2005 between communities in the Kajo-Keji county of South Sudan and the Ugandan district of Moyo.  Tensions and incidents of violence along the border forced the suspension of a project to construct a road and a communications tower in the area. The presidents of Uganda and the South Sudan region met in November 2010 to promote the peaceful resolution of the dispute, but an agreement has not yet been reached.  Surveyors from Uganda are expected to inspect the border in 2011.

On October 27, 2020, the SSPDF and the UPDF clashed near Pogee, Magwi County, in South Sudan's Eastern Equatoria State, leaving two South Sudanese soldiers dead. Both sides believed they were on their country's side of the border.

Lord's Resistance Army 
Based on an agreement with the government in Khartoum, Ugandan military forces entered Southern Sudan in 2002 to fight LRA rebels.  The agreement expired in 2006 and was not formally renewed by the Southern Sudan regional government, but Ugandan military operations were allowed to continue. A rift developed over appropriate strategy when Joseph Kony, leader of the LRA, refused to appear twice to sign peace agreements.  In June 2008, relations between South Sudan and Uganda became further strained when Uganda People's Defence Force (UPDF) soldiers were accused of posing as LRA rebels and killing and kidnapping civilians in the Nabanga area.  Following this incident, Southern Sudan demanded that Uganda withdraw its troops from its territory. Nevertheless, in 2008-9 troops from Uganda, South Sudan and Congo launched the joint Garamba Offensive in the Democratic Republic of Congo in an effort to eliminate the LRA militarily.

The LRA's strength is estimated to now be in the hundreds, and the LRA presence has largely been removed from Northern Uganda. But the LRA continues to launch attacks in Western Equatoria and Western Bahr El Ghazal States of Southern Sudan. As of April 2011, 14 attacks have resulted in 10 deaths and 29 abductions. The SPLA has armed and trained local community defense organizations, called Arrow Boys, to protect villages in areas of Southern Sudan still affected by the rebel group.

References

 
Uganda
Bilateral relations of Uganda